The Ba'athist Arabization campaigns in northern Iraq involved Arabization and ethnic cleansing of minorities (primarily Kurds, as well as Turkmen, Yazidis, Assyrians, and Shabaks), in line with settler colonialist policies, to shift the demographics of northern Iraq towards Arab domination. In 1978 and 1979, 600 Kurdish villages were burned down and around 200,000 Kurds were sent to other parts of Iraq.

The campaigns took place as part of the Iraqi–Kurdish conflict, largely motivated by the Kurdish-Arab ethnic and political conflict. The Baathist policies motivating those events are sometimes referred to as "internal colonialism", described by Francis Kofi Abiew as a "Colonial 'Arabization'" program, including large-scale Kurdish deportations and forced Arab settlement in the region.

Background

The Yazidis, the Shabaks and the Assyrians are minorities in Iraq and historically were concentrated in northern Iraq, and they are still sizeable populations there in the early 21st century, in line with more prominent ethnic groups of Kurds, Turkmen and Arabs.

Under the Iraqi Hashemite monarchy as well as the subsequent Republican regime, Yazidis were discriminated against: measures applied included the loss of land, military repression and efforts to force them into the central state's struggle against the Kurdish National Movement.

Policies

Displacement of minorities and Arab settlement

From early 1979, under Saddam Hussein, both Kurds and Yazidis were confronted with village destruction, depopulation and deportation.  Kurdish displacement in the North in the mid-1970s mostly took place in Sheikhan and Sinjar regions but also covered an area stretching from the town of Khanaqin. The repressive measures carried out by the government against the Kurds after the 1975 Algiers Agreement led to renewed clashes between the Iraqi Army and Kurdish guerrillas in 1977. In 1978 and 1979, 600 Kurdish villages were burned down, and around 200,000 Kurds were deported to the other parts of the country.

Arabization concentrated on moving Arabs to the vicinity of oil fields in northern Iraq, particularly the ones around Kirkuk. The Ba'athist government was also responsible for driving out at least 70,000 Kurds from the Mosul’s western half, thus making western Mosul into all Sunni Arab. In Sinjar, in late 1974, the former Committee for Northern Affairs ordered the confiscation of property, the destruction of the mostly Yezidi villages and the forced settlement into 11 new towns with Arab placenames that were constructed 30–40 km north or south of Sinjar, or other parts of Iraq. There were 37 Yezidi villages destroyed in the process and five neighbourhoods in Sinjar Arabized in 1975. The same year, 413 Muslim Kurd and Yezidi farmers were dispossessed of their lands by the government or had their agricultural contracts cancelled and replaced by Arab settlers. In Sheikhan in 1975, 147 out of a total of 182 villages suffered forced displacement, and 64 villages were handed over to Arab settlers in the years following. Seven new towns were built in Sheikhan to house the displaced Yezidi and Kurdish residents of Arabized villages.

As part of the Al-Anfal Campaign, during the Iran–Iraq War, Saddam's regime destroyed 3,000 to 4,000 villages and drove hundreds of thousands of Kurds to become refugees or be resettled across Iraq, as well as Assyrians and Turkmen. Some 100,000 people were killed or died during the al-Anfal campaign, which is often equated to ethnic cleansing and genocide. The forced campaign of Arabization also attempted to transform the multi-ethnic city of Kirkuk, with a Turkmen plurality, into an Arab majority city.

In the 1990s, the distribution of land to Arab settlers was resumed and continued until the fall of the Ba'ath regime, in 2003.

Cultural and political Arabization
In the Iraqi censuses in 1977 and 1987, Yezidis were forced to register as Arabs. Some Muslim Kurds were also forced to register as Arabs in 1977.

Legal basis
The legal basis for Arabization was the Revolutionary Command Council's Decree (RCCD) No. 795 from 1975 and the RCCD No. 358 from 1978. The former authorized the confiscation of property from members of the Kurdish National Movement, and the latter allowed invalidation of property deeds belonging to displaced Muslim Kurds and Yezidis, the nationalization of their land under the control of the Iraqi Ministry of Finance and the resettlement of the region by Arab families.

After 2003

After Saddam's fall, many Kurdish families settled in Kirkuk. These policies of Kurdification by the KDP and PUK after 2003 aimed to reverse the previous trends of Arabization. This has prompted inter-ethnic problems with non-Kurds, especially Assyrians and Turkmen.

Kirkuk referendum plans
The Kirkuk status referendum is the Kirkuk Governorate part of a plebiscite that will decide whether the multi-ethnic regions within Iraqi governorates of Diyala, Kirkuk, Saladin and Nineveh will become part of the Iraqi Kurdistan region. The referendum was initially planned for 15 November 2007, but was delayed first to 31 December, and then by a further six months. The Kurdish Alliance emphasized that the delay was for technical and not for political reasons. As the election was not called by early December 2008, it was postponed again as part of the deal to facilitate the regional elections on 31 January 2009. No fresh date has yet been set.

Article 140 of the Constitution of Iraq states that before the referendum is carried out, measures should be taken to reverse the Arabization policy employed by the Saddam Hussein administration during the Al-Anfal Campaign. Thousands of Kurds returned to Kirkuk following the 2003 invasion of Iraq. The referendum will decide whether enough have returned for the area to be considered Kurdish.

See also 

 Destruction of Kurdish villages during the Iraqi Arabization campaign

References

Arabization
History of colonialism
Modern history of Iraq
History of Kurdistan
History of the Ba'ath Party
Iraqi–Kurdish conflict
Kirkuk Governorate
Persecution of Kurds in Iraq
Internal migration
Settlement schemes in the Middle East
Racism in the Arab world